Newcastle was a provincial electoral district in the Canadian province of British Columbia to the south and including some of the city of Nanaimo. It appeared in the 1916 and 1920 elections only. In 1924, portions of it were incorporated into the new Cowichan-Newcastle riding. For other ridings in the Nanaimo area, please see Nanaimo (electoral districts).

Demographics

Electoral history
Note: Winners of each election are in bold.

|-

{{CANelec |BC |Independent Socialist |Parker Williams |551 |56.11%'' | |unknown}}
|- bgcolor="white"
!align="right" colspan=3|Total valid votes
!align="right"|982
!align="right"|100.00%
!align="right"|
|- bgcolor="white"
!align="right" colspan=3|Total rejected ballots
!align="right"|
!align="right"|
!align="right"|
|- bgcolor="white"
!align="right" colspan=3|Turnout
!align="right"|%
!align="right"|
!align="right"|
|}

|Federated Labour|Samuel Guthrie|align="right"|704|align="right"|42.00%'''
|align="right"|
|align="right"|unknown

|- bgcolor="white"
!align="right" colspan=3|Total valid votes
!align="right"|1,676
!align="right"|100.00%
!align="right"|
|- bgcolor="white"
!align="right" colspan=3|Total rejected ballots
!align="right"|
!align="right"|
!align="right"|
|- bgcolor="white"
!align="right" colspan=3|Turnout
!align="right"|%
!align="right"|
!align="right"|
|}

Former provincial electoral districts of British Columbia on Vancouver Island